Formin-2 (FMN2) is an actin binding structural protein and has a localized expression pattern in the developing and adult forms of the central nervous system (CNS). FMN2 plays an important role in the nucleation and assembly of actin filaments. In humans, this gene is located on Chromosome 1.

FMN2 plays a role in the ability of neurons to migrate and innervate target tissues. FMN2 is present in the filopodial tips of neuronal growth cones and influences its pathfinding ability. In chicks FMN2 plays a role in migration of spinal commissural neurons. FMN2 is reported to act like a clutch molecule generating traction to join the actin cytoskeleton to the growth cone.

Biallelic mutations in this gene have been associated with Nonsyndromic Autosomal Recessive Intellectual Disability.

FMN2 double knockout mice are seen to be normal in gross and microscopic morphology of the brain but show decreased fertility, improper positioning of the metaphase spindle and problems in the polar body formation during oogenesis.

References 

Actin-based structures
Structural proteins